The men's 400 m surface competition in finswimming at the 2009 World Games took place on 23 July 2009 at the Kaohsiung Swimming Pool in Kaohsiung, Taiwan.

Competition format
A total of 15 athletes entered the competition. The best eight athletes from preliminary round qualifies to the final.

Results

Preliminary

Final

References

External links
 Results on IWGA website

Finswimming at the 2009 World Games